Rookie Blue is a Canadian police drama television series starring Missy Peregrym and Gregory Smith. It was created by Morwyn Brebner, Tassie Cameron, and Ellen Vanstone. The series premiered on June 24, 2010, at 9:00 p.m. Eastern/8:00 p.m. Central, and aired on Global in Canada and ABC in the United States.

On July 17, 2013, Global and ABC following later announced that Rookie Blue  was renewed for a fifth season. Originally intended to be a single season consisting of 22 episodes (up from the usual 13), the season was split in two. Season 5 premiered on May 19, 2014, on Global, on June 19 on ABC, and on July 20 on Universal Channel in the UK. The second 11 episodes aired in 2015 and were later re-branded as season 6. The final episode of Season 6 aired that July.

On October 16, 2015, it was announced that Rookie Blue had completed its run after six seasons and would not be returning.

Plot

There's something really primal about the idea of being a rookie—it hits that horrible, eternal sense of feeling like a fraud, like a kid dressed in grown-up clothes, trying to pretend you know what you're doing. And I thought, what if you were feeling just like that—but with a gun?
—Tassie Cameron, Executive Producer

Set in Toronto, the series follows the lives of five rookie police officers from fictional 15 Division who have just graduated from the academy. The officers must learn to deal with not only their duties as police officers, but also the problems and expectations of family, friends, and romantic attachments at the office. They are first responders who are about to learn that no amount of training prepares you for life.

"To serve, protect, and..." is usually used in the parade room before shift starts by the officer leading the parade. It always has a significant meaning in the context of the episode plot. More often than not, however, they use "to serve, protect, and don't screw up".

Rookie Blue has been described as the Grey's Anatomy of the world of rookie cops.

Setting
The series is set in Toronto, often referencing local street names and areas. The streets are often recognizable, as is the case with Jameson Avenue in Parkdale, the location of a call-out in the pilot episode.

Cast

Main

Officers
 Missy Peregrym portrays Andrea "Andy" Grace McNally, the series protagonist. She is driven by the desire to do the right thing even if it means not following procedure. Her father, Tommy McNally, was formerly a homicide detective before he burned out. As a result, McNally carries her father's baggage, trying to prove herself. Andy is the most positive person on the job—because she knows first-hand where the job can take you, and she does not want to go there. Her mother, Claire, is a social services worker who abandoned them when Andy was a teenager. She studied Sociology/Psychology before becoming a cop and she was an A student. At the beginning of the series she begins a relationship with homicide detective Luke Callaghan, and the two move in together at the end of season 1, although she and her training officer, Sam Swarek, have a palpable chemistry. After having shot her first person on the job, she is confused and runs to him, intending to sleep with him in order to stop thinking. Before it progresses too far, she walks out on him, something that leaves them in discomfort for several episodes. She later becomes engaged to Callaghan but breaks up with him after he sleeps with his ex-girlfriend, Detective Jo Rosati. She finally admits that she has feelings for Swarek, but by the time she is ready to tell him he has already left on an undercover mission. The last three episodes of Season 2 show viewers the beginning of Swarek and McNally's relationship, even though he is undercover, which leads them both to suspension for "conduct unbecoming" when they are discovered. In the beginning of season 3, Andy returns from a trip after her three months suspension and gets her job back as well as restarting her relationship with Swarek. When her mother suddenly appears in her life due to a work case, she decides to let her back in after she asks for a second chance. After Detective Barber's death, Swarek breaks up with her, which causes a lot of pain for Andy. After a month and a half, and in a life-threatening situation when she is holding a grenade, Swarek says to her that he loves her and then he tries to get her back. But for Andy, it is too little, too late. Then Detective Callaghan asks her to participate in a task force, which will keep her isolated and away from 15 Division for an extended period of time. She accepts but has to leave immediately, which leaves Swarek drinking at the Penny (the local bar) while waiting for her. In the first episode of season 4, when she returns, she finds out he has been dating Officer Marlo Cruz while she was gone. She is a bit competitive but eventually decides to move on. She becomes closer to Nick Collins, who was her partner undercover, resulting in the two of them beginning a new relationship. When Sam gets shot in the season 4 finale, she goes in the ambulance with Sam, and then confesses that she still loves him. It is shown in season 5 that the two are together again. At the end of season 5, Andy is caught in a bomb attack at the station, but escapes unharmed. In Season 6, when it is revealed that Marlo is pregnant with Sam's child, it causes tension between Andy and Sam, with Andy feeling left out. However, their relationship remains strong and they marry at the end of Season 6.
 Charlotte Sullivan portrays Gail Peck. She spent a few years as a half-goth. Underneath her caustic exterior, Gail is vulnerable and feels lonely. Because she is the daughter of high-ranking officials in the police force she is often seen by others as getting preferential treatment. Her mother is a superintendent, her father is an inspector, her brother a successful narcotics detective, and her godfather is the chief of police. Because of this, she feels the need to prove to herself and others that she can do the job without help, which further isolates her. In Season 1, she develops a relationship with Chris Diaz. However, the two break up in season 2 because Chris believes that she likes Dov but none of them are willing to clarify how they really feel. In Season 3, it is revealed that she was previously engaged to the new rookie, Nick Collins, with whom she begins a new relationship. Later, she is kidnapped by a cab driver after working undercover as an escort and is rescued, but at the expense of Detective Jerry Barber's life. When she takes the fall for a shooting in the 15 Division, her job is put on the line, but she does not lose it under the condition that she be treated as a new rookie. Gail ends up isolating herself from her friends due to the way she treats Chloe. Seeing how close Nick and Andy had gotten since their undercover operation, she becomes jealous and cheats on Nick with a detective who worked with him and Andy during their sting operation. As a result, she and Nick break up. Later in season 4, she ends up meeting and befriending Holly, a forensic specialist, and lesbian. The two share a brief kiss in the coat closet at Frank and Noelle's wedding and eventually begin a tentative relationship. At the end of season 5, Gail and Holly break up and Gail decides to adopt Sophie, the orphaned daughter of a woman killed in a case Gail worked on.
 Travis Milne portrays Chris Diaz. He is often seen as taking the "by the book" approach. He believes in the chain of command, following orders, doing the right thing and above all, he believes in defending the weak. Despite this seemingly good trait, it makes him unable to take initiative. He becomes involved in a relationship with Gail Peck until he is forced to notify the authorities of corruption that Peck's brother's partner was involved in. This temporarily costs him the relationship with Peck. However, the two reconcile and are seen happily together in the beginning of season 2.  Their relationship ends when he accuses her and Dov of sneaking around behind his back. He eventually makes amends with Dov, but not with Gail. After a while, he realizes that he still has feelings for Gail, only to discover that she is now with Nick Collins. He finds out that his ex-girlfriend, Denise, had his child without telling him but accepts his role as a father and begins making family-centred decisions. He considers a transfer to Timmins at the end of the third season because Denise does not want to live in the city and he still wishes to remain close to his son, Christian. In the fifth episode of season 4, Chris accepts his transfer to Timmins early and leaves, only saying goodbye to Oliver. However, he reappears in the ninth episode of season 4 when he comes to visit for the long weekend with Denise and Christian. Christian is later kidnapped while under the care of Andy and Nick, and it is later to be revealed that the kidnapper is his biological father, Gene McKenzie. In episode 10, Chris transfers back to 15 Division. He is no longer with Denise, but struggles to be so far from his son. Dov later discovers that Chris is becoming addicted to cocaine, which results in a fallout between the two. However, Chris takes some time off to recover and things are made right again with Dov. In Season 6, he is in affair with Jamie, a recovering alcoholic, who is revealed to be the wife of Inspector Jarvis. Chris tries numerous times to end things with her but finds himself incapable of doing so. At the end of Season 6, it is revealed that Jarvis had known about the affair but that he himself had a girlfriend since he and his wife were getting divorced.
 Peter Mooney portrays Nick Collins. He appears for first time in season 3. He is a former soldier who served for four years, including a tour in Afghanistan, before becoming a cop. Before the series began he was in a relationship with Gail Peck, and they were ready to marry in Las Vegas before he enlisted. When he first comes to 15 Division they start a new relationship, albeit after much coaxing on his part. His military training and experience is often considered as an asset by his colleagues. In the season 3 finale he is selected as the other officer to participate in Callaghan's task force, resulting in his developing feelings for Andy. He eventually breaks up with Gail when he finds out that she slept with someone else. He tells Andy on the night of Frank and Noelle's wedding that he has romantic feelings for her, but Andy needs time to sort things out. He and Andy begin a relationship shortly after. However, Nick knows subconsciously that Andy is still in love with Sam, which is acknowledged when the latter is shot at the end of Season 4. He tells Andy to go see Sam at the hospital, showing that he knows that she can never let go of Sam. In Season 5 they are no longer together but eventually go back to being good friends. In Season 6 Nick meets Officer Juliet Ward who, unbeknownst to him, is an undercover officer for Internal Affairs. He expresses an immediate interest in her, but Ward tries not to get close to any of the officers that she is investigating. However, the two eventually give in to their feelings for each other and begin a relationship. When it comes to light that she is investigating their division, Nick breaks it off with her, feeling betrayed. At the end of Season 6, Ward is on her way to Vancouver when Nick stops her to tell her that he wants to go with her, indicating that he has forgiven her.
 Priscilla Faia portrays Chloe Price. She appears for the first time in season 4, when she is first introduced as a one-night stand of Dov's and then later revealed to be Frank's goddaughter and the newest rookie to be transferred to 15 Division. She is talkative and bubbly, which sometimes annoys the other rookies. However, she shows herself to be a competent officer. She and Dov embark on a relationship, until Dov finds out that she is married to Wes, an officer from her old division. It does not help that he finds out about Wes by meeting Wes himself while Chloe is in a coma and unable to explain anything. When Chloe wakes up and recovers, she assures Dov that she and Wes had not been together for a long time and that they were getting divorced. However, she kisses Wes one day and Dov breaks up with her. She spends the season trying to win him back but Dov responds coldly. At the very end of Season 6, Dov has an outburst and their problems are finally out in the open. They kiss and get back together.

Detectives
 Gregory Smith portrays Dov Epstein. He was a sickly asthmatic kid who watched reruns of Starsky and Hutch while in bed and his older brother, Adam, killed himself, something that Dov still does not understand. His parents were "hippies", but his grandmother paid for him to have a private education. He is often shown to be overeager to get involved in everything even when it is not necessary for him to do so. This characteristic has gotten him into trouble many times, so much so he has been told to "slow it down". However, in season 2, Epstein's desire to be heavily involved enables him to save a man's life. He is Chris Diaz's best friend and roommate, and later Gail's roommate as well when she moves in with them. In season 2, he meets and becomes involved with Sue, a bomb technician from ETF, whom he always tries to impress, thinking he does not deserve her. They break up when he develops feelings for Crystal, the sister of the boy he shot and killed. In season 4 he has a one-night stand with Chloe Price, a woman he met in a bar and later finds out to be Frank's god-daughter as well as 15 Division's latest officer. By the middle of the season, however, the two of them have started a relationship. When Chloe is shot on the job, Epstein finds out that she is still married to an officer from her old division, Wes. He forgives her for this, but after he discovers that Wes kissed her and she hid the evidence from him, he breaks up with her, much to Chloe's dismay. They eventually get back together. At the end of season 6 he is promoted to detective.
 Ben Bass portrays Samuel "Sam" Jay Swarek. He is known for following his instincts rather than following the book and is thus labeled as a rogue cop by his frustrated superiors. Formerly an undercover officer working on a money laundering operation, his cover is exposed when McNally arrests him in the series premiere, believing him to be a suspect in a murder case. He returns to 15 Division as a training officer for the rookies, awaiting a position to open up in Guns and Gangs. In episode 7 (Hot and Bothered) of season 1, Andy, upset and confused, goes to see him at night and almost sleeps with him. This makes their relationship awkward afterward, but the two talk and make amends later. Although McNally is his love interest, he insists that their relationship is strictly professional. But in season 2 there still might be hope for McNally and him because of McNally's fiancé Luke Callaghan cheating on her. During episode 10 (Best Laid Plans) of season 2, he went back into undercover operations before he had the chance to become romantically involved with McNally. However, they meet in the following episode and finally hook up. After getting suspended, he asks Andy to have a real relationship, but she leaves town to keep her job, since one of the terms of the suspension was for Swarek and McNally to not see each other, which leaves him disoriented.  In the beginning of season 3, Andy convinces him to restart the relationship, although he wants to take it slow. He has a sister, Sarah, who was attacked as a kid, and that is why he became a cop. When Andy's mother reappears in her life, he investigates her, and we see that he doesn't like or trust Claire because he blames her for Andy's pain. When Detective Barber dies, he goes into a dark place and starts to question Andy's instincts as a cop. He then wonders how much he will sacrifice for their relationship, so he breaks up with her saying that he cannot take it anymore. Everyone tells him how foolish he is for what he's done, but he has already noticed. When he sees Andy terrified and holding a grenade, he confesses his love for her. Then he tries to convince her that breaking up was a mistake, that he will do anything to make it up to her, but she is hurt and not sure he means it. He asks her for drinks, but he is left waiting as she is already gone for the task force without talking to him. In season 4, he becomes detective and has been dating Officer Marlo Cruz. He was shot in the last episode of season 4, but recovers. It is later revealed in season 5 that his father, Jay Swarek, is an inmate at Millburn Penitentiary, and was in and out of his childhood. He and Oliver Shaw begin to have suspicions about corruption within the police force. At the end of season 6, his daughter with Marlo is born and he marries Andy McNally.
 Adam MacDonald portrays Steve Peck. Steve is Gail's older brother and a corrupt detective in the Guns and Gangs division. He is partnered up with Traci to serve as a distraction from dealing with the copycat of the man that murdered Jerry, her dead fiancé. He ends up having feelings for Traci which are reciprocated, but she doesn't think it's the right time. He reveals that he is a corrupt cop and is arrested which also ended his relationship with Traci.
 Noam Jenkins portrays Jerry Barber. A divorced detective at 15 Division, he actively participated in operations and stings, coordinating officers and other resources at his disposal. He later became Traci's boyfriend and eventually sold his car, Stella, as sign that he wants to be serious in being more family oriented. Detective Barber died in episode 9 of season 3 due to a fatal stab wound to the abdomen while trying to solve Peck's kidnapping.
 Eric Johnson portrays Luke Callaghan. A homicide detective at 15 Division, he is tireless and exceedingly charming. He was involved in a relationship with McNally until he cheated on her with his ex-girlfriend, Jo Rosati. McNally ends the relationship, but Luke wants her back, and the fallout causes Jo Rosati to leave 15 Division. He is heartbroken but eventually accepts that Andy doesn't want him back. This is particularly seen when he discovers that Andy and Sam had been seeing each other while Sam was undercover. He is gone half of third season due to a task force mission. He comes back after Gail's kidnapping. At the end of the season, he asks Andy and Nick to participate in the task force with him.
 Melanie Nicholls-King portrays Noelle Williams. Was originally a training officer and is veteran of the police force, she hoped to become head of 15 Division but was beaten out by Frank Best. Noelle is not only great at her job, but she is also an invaluable mentor for the rookies in her division. During the first season, she was trying to get pregnant with the aid of hormone injections. She was caught by Traci who subsequently helped her. In episode 9 of season 2, she and Frank Best kiss, embarking on a relationship. It is revealed in the finale of season 2 that Noelle is pregnant with Frank Best's child and in the beginning of the third season, she is keeping it a secret. In episode 9 of season 3, she goes into labour a month early and delivers a healthy baby girl named Olivia. In season 4, she becomes engaged to Staff Sergeant Frank Best after he proposes to her following a faked homicide involving officers Peck and Epstein. On their wedding day, Noelle goes missing, and Traci discovers that she is planning to ditch the wedding because she had found a possibly-cancerous lump in her breast. She is later convinced to go through with the wedding, and has since been optimistic about her recovery. As of season six, she is a Detective working for central headquarters, presumably coordinating Toronto Police's Internal Affairs branch.
 Rachael Ancheril portrays Marlo Cruz. During the six months in which Andy and Nick are away, Sam moves on and enters into a relationship with her. She is well liked by everyone, but she and Andy end up in situations together as partners. The tension between them builds. It is later revealed that she is bipolar, and she tells Andy, who promises to keep her secret. In episode 12 of season 4, Marlo's obsession with proving a man is a child molester causes her condition to take her over. When the man is attacked after Marlo confronted him, Andy tells Sam about Marlo being bi-polar and they try to hide her involvement in the case. Her job is on the line, after she may have caused something very tragic for 15 Division, she transfers to Intelligence. Now a Detective, she is put on a case with 15 Division and there is some tension between her and Andy. It is revealed at the end of season five that she is pregnant (with Sam's child). In season 6, Marlo gives birth to her and Sam's daughter.

Sergeants
 Enuka Okuma portrays Traci Nash. The calm in the eye of the storm and the consummate confidante, Traci is the anchor for her fellow rookies. She is also practical and responsible, likely the result of having had a child, Leo, while in high school. She is a single mother trying to find the balance between her work and her family. Complications arise both at work and at home as she once dated Detective Jerry Barber until she decided to try to get back together with her son's father, Dex. She's always trying to focus on her son and do everything that's best for him. However, this sometimes gets in the way of her being a police officer. She later starts a serious relationship with Detective Barber, culminating in an engagement. In season 3, Traci becomes a detective in training. She is devastated when Detective Barber is murdered in the line of duty. In season 4, Gail's brother, Steve Peck, returns. He is a detective from Guns and Gangs and he develops feelings for Nash. She is wary at first to start a new relationship with him, after Jerry's death. She is also worried about her son Leo getting attached to another man. But Peck proves to her that he is serious about her and the two start dating. She is heartbroken after finding out that Steve was involved with the corruption scandal and she leaves him. She is promoted to Detective Sergeant, head of Guns and Gangs, at the end of season 6.
 Matt Gordon portrays Oliver Shaw, one of the rookies' training officers and a veteran of the police force. He is the kind of cop who doesn't go looking for trouble but doesn't shy away from it when it finds him. He is one of the few older police officers with a functional marriage and family, having a wife and three daughters, but he is kicked out by his wife in episode 9 of season 2 after she finds out that he went to a strip club. He and his wife had been on and off before he realizes that she was in love with someone else. He then files for divorce and moves out. He is dating a witch named Celery, played by Emily Hampshire. He is promoted to staff sergeant in season 5, but opts to return to an Officer's role during season 6, however he re-accepts the job at the end of season 6.
 Lyriq Bent portrays Frank Best. In the first episode of the series, it was revealed that he was newly divorced. Frank was a training officer until he was promoted to Staff Sergeant after Boyko  was promoted and departed in the episode "Honor Roll". During season 2, he became romantically involved with Officer Noelle Williams. In season 3, their daughter was born. In season 4, Frank proposed to Noelle after a fake homicide involving Peck and Dov was staged. They later married. In season 5 after the events concluding season 4, Frank is released as Staff Sergeant.

Supporting
 Peter MacNeill portrays Tommy McNally. He is Andy's father. Formerly a homicide detective, he has a drinking problem. His wife, Claire, abandoned him and Andy when she was a kid. In the first season, Andy tries to help him. He refuses at first but finally agrees after she gives him an ultimatum. In episode 11 of season 1, he becomes a murder suspect. Swarek and Andy try to prove that he didn't do it, and they succeed.
 Barbara Williams portrays Claire McNally. She is Andy's mother. She works in social services. She had an affair with a professor when Andy was a kid and asked her to leave with her, which Andy refused. Andy's father then gets custody of her and forbids Claire to talk to or visit her, as she was confused and hurt. She comes back into her life during a work case, which reveals many contradictory emotions for both of them. Andy finally accepts her back, and during the season, we see them doing some mother/daughter things together.
 Aaron Abrams portrays Donovan Boyd. He is a guns and gangs detective who seems to be always over the edge. He is the one who drags Swarek into undercover operations. He gets ticked off with Andy when she and Chris arrest a drug dealer who is part of an operation that he is running on the dark, which makes him look like a fool. At the end of the second season, he recruits Andy, Traci and Dov to go on a little scavenger hunt to accumulate drugs and money. That ends with Andy running into Swarek, who is also on an undercover operation with a dangerous criminal, Jamie Brennan. Boyd is responsible for the cover up of Brennan's wife and daughter's murder, which puts Sam at risk as Boyd didn't create a proper cover story for Swarek.
 Camille Sullivan portrays Jo Rosati. She is a homicide detective. She was engaged to Luke, as they were partnered together for three years before leaving to pursue a career opportunity that only one of them could take even though Luke wanted them to stay together. She comes back to 15 Division trying to get Luke back, just to find out he is with Andy now. This situation puts her in the middle of Luke and Andy's relationship. After Luke is shot, she convinces him to do a surveillance job in a hotel room, and they hook up in the end. While partnered with Andy, the truth comes out, and Andy calls off the engagement. Luke asks her to leave because he wants to get Andy back.
 Mayko Nguyen portrays Sue Tran. She is a bomb technician for ETF. She meets Dov when he is trapped by a bomb in a drug lab and saves him. On their first date she helps him solve a robbery bank case. In the beginning of season three it seems that they live together. Later on, Dov breaks up with her because of his feelings for the sister of the boy he shot.
 Aliyah O'Brien portrays Holly Stewart. Appears for the first time in Season 4 Episode 7. She is a forensic pathologist who soon becomes one of Gail's closest friends and later girlfriend when they meet during an investigation. Holly Stewart is a lesbian. At the end of season 4, Holly and Gail begin a tentative relationship.
 Jim Codrington portrays ETF Sgt Bailey. He is seen throughout seasons 3–5 with his team helping the officers of 15 Division.
 Emily Hampshire portrays Celery. Celery is dating Oliver. Oliver first met her when she was arrested with suspicion of poisoning somebody, but it was soon very obvious that she had nothing to do with it. Oliver later takes her to Frank's wedding and this was like their first date.

Production and development
The series is produced by E1 Entertainment, Canwest, and Thump, Inc. The pilot script was written by Ilana Frank. In February 2009, Canwest ordered the show straight-to-series with a 13 episode order under the working title Copper. ABC purchased the U.S. broadcast rights to the series in April 2009.

The first role cast was Andy McNally, portrayed by Missy Peregrym, followed by Gregory Smith cast as Dov Epstein. Additional casting was announced in early July. Production began in Toronto, Ontario, on July 14, 2009, and was expected to continue through November 2009. Thirteen episodes were produced.

On June 21, 2010 The Accessible Channel announced that Rookie Blue would be the first series to premiere with a simultaneous Described Video broadcast for people with vision impairments.

Filming of the second season took place between September 1, 2010 and January 25, 2011. Tassie Cameron served as head writer and series showrunner, with Georgia Toews serving as writing assistant.

Filming of the third season took place between August 25, 2011 and January 23, 2012.

Filming of the fourth season took place between August 20, 2012 and January 25, 2013.

Filming of the combined fifth and sixth seasons took place between January 20, 2014 and October 1, 2014.

On September 3, 2015, during an interview with Missy Peregrym in The Hollywood Reporter, it was reported that the season six finale would likely be the Rookie Blue series finale, since the series regulars have not been called back for another season.

Broadcast
Rookie Blue is distributed by E1 Entertainment. NBC Universal Global Networks (also known as Universal Networks International) purchased broadcast rights in all markets except Canada (country of origin), France, Germany, and the United States. Ion Television acquired the off network rights to the series in the United States. Ion ran the show starting in December 2014 on Friday nights at 10:00 p.m. with five episodes in a row, however by mid-February 2015 the show had been pulled from Ion's schedule due to low ratings, and replaced first by Blue Bloods, then Cold Case.

Home media
Entertainment One releases the show on DVD and a few season on Blu-ray in Region 1. The Canadian releases contain an additional French audio track and the Canadian Blu-ray release is three discs instead of four. In Australia (Region 4), only the first two seasons were released. However, Via Vision Entertainment has acquired the rights to the series and will released the complete series boxset on November 18, 2020.

Reception

Critical response
Metacritic summarizes the response as "mixed or average reviews". One of the more favorable reviews came from Alessandra Stanley of The New York Times, saying "it's not a groundbreaking police drama, nor is it divertingly cheesy. It's well made and well meaning." Robert Lloyd from the Los Angeles Times was also favorable with the show, and agreed with Stanley describing it as nothing new to television, but he rather enjoyed it and saying "Rookie Blue doesn't oversell itself. It is modest and plain in a way that makes even its less likely moments feel credible enough." Rob Salem of the Toronto Star favorably compared the series to Grey's Anatomy. "Call it Blues Anatomy (or  Academy, take your pick)." Salem found the show "slickly produced and engagingly acted" and had a particular fondness for Missy Peregrym's character, which he described as "the Meredith surrogate". The Globe and Mail'''s television critic, John Doyle, described Rookie Blue as "a good cop show with a terrible title." Doyle went on to say "it's a very slick, glossy melodrama, all handsome actors and admirably sharp storylines. Yet it's true to its Toronto roots."

Among the more negative reviewers was Rob Owen of the Pittsburgh Post-Gazette. Owen calls the show "Grey's Anatomy in a police station." He did however hope to see some interaction between religion and police through one of the characters but stated "Given the generally bland nature of Rookie Blue, that's probably too much to ask." Paige Wiser from the Chicago Sun-Times describes the show as overly generic and claims that the rookies look more like puppies than police officers. She said "if you're looking for a new cop drama to serve and protect your entertainment interests, leave the rookies alone to ripen, and go for a ride-along with Jason Lee's Dwight." Randee Dawn from The Hollywood Reporter was much harsher, calling the writing lazy and describing the motivation of the rookies as selfish, saying that they are there to make themselves feel good and not to protect the city. Dawn said "at its core, Rookie is a terrible show." Alex Strachan of Montreal's The Gazette was unimpressed, stating that "The acting is uneven, the writing and directing aren't particularly stylish or inspired, and you've seen it countless times before." Strachan went on to say that Rookie Blue is "a harmless enough diversion on an otherwise lazy summer TV night."

Ratings
The Canadian premiere drew an audience of 1.9 million viewers with 712,000 in the 18–49 category, placing first for the night and second for the week. It is the highest rated premiere for a Canwest-commissioned drama series within the previous five years.

In the U.S.A the premiere drew 7.253 million viewers and an audience share in the 18–49 category of 2.0 out of 6. Furthermore, it improved upon the programming a year beforehand (20/20'' special) by having +1.6 million viewers and +18% in the 18–49 age group. The premiere became the most successful scripted summer debut in over a year and in nearly six years for ABC.

Awards and nominations

References

External links

  for Global
  for ABC
 

2010 Canadian television series debuts
2015 Canadian television series endings
2010s Canadian crime drama television series
English-language television shows
Lesbian-related television shows
Canadian police procedural television series
Television shows filmed in Toronto
Television shows set in Toronto
Global Television Network original programming
Television series by Entertainment One
Television series by Corus Entertainment
2010s Canadian LGBT-related drama television series